On 8 March 1994, a Sahara Airlines Boeing 737 crashed shortly after takeoff. The plane slammed into an Aeroflot Ilyushin Il-86, which led to both aircraft being destroyed. All 8 crew members on both planes were killed, along with one person on the ground. There were no passengers on either aircraft during the crash. The cause of the crash was determined to be pilot error.

Aircraft 
The aircraft was manufactured for Busy Bee in 1979. It had also made its first flight on April 25, 1979. The aircraft was sold to Sahara Airlines in October 1993. At the time of the accident, the aircraft was almost 15 years old. It was equipped with 2 Pratt & Whitney JT8D-17 engines.

Flight crew 
The flight crew consisted of a flight instructor and three trainee pilots.

Accident 
On Tuesday, March 8, 1994, the Boeing 737-200 took off from Delhi-Indira Gandhi International Airport, India. At the time of the accident, the Boeing 737-200 had completed five normal training exercises and landings. However, during the sixth training exercise, the aircraft climbed to  when it banked left and crashed at the International Terminal Apron. The wreckage of aircraft hit an Aeroflot Ilyushin Il-86 aircraft, Flight 558, parked on Bay No. 45 as a result of which it also caught fire. All 4 crew members were killed, as well as all 4 crew members inside the Aeroflot Ilyushin Il-86 aircraft. Additionally, an employee of an airport oil company was killed when the plane impacted the tarmac.

Investigation 
Investigation by the India Commercial Pilot Association (ICPA) revealed that the accident occurred due to application of wrong rudder by a trainee pilot during engine failure exercise. The flight instructor did not guard or block the rudder control and give clear commands during his role to avoid the application of wrong rudder control by the trainee pilot.

References

Airliner accidents and incidents caused by pilot error
Accidents and incidents involving the Boeing 737 Original
Accidents and incidents involving the Ilyushin Il-86
Aviation accidents and incidents in 1994
Aviation accidents and incidents in India
Aviation accidents and incidents caused by loss of control
1994 disasters in India